AGSM may refer to;

 Associate of the Guildhall School of Music and Drama, post-nominal letters used by those with a specific qualification in professional music performance (rather than drama) following full-time study at the school
 A. Gary Anderson Graduate School of Management, a division of the School of Business Administration at the University of California, Riverside, US
 American Gold Star Mothers, an organization of American mothers who lost sons or daughters in U.S. military service
 Australian Graduate School of Management, the MBA program of the Australian School of Business in Sydney, New South Wales, Australia
 Anti-G Straining Maneuvers, a component of high-G training